Thomas Ridgewayor Ridgway may refer to:

Thomas Ridgeway (fl.1414), MP for Derby (UK Parliament constituency)
 Thomas Ridgeway, 1st Earl of Londonderry (1565?–1631)
Thomas Ridgway, trader
Thomas S. Ridgway (1826–1897), American politician
Thomas Ridgway (colonel) (1861–1939), U.S. Army officer and father of General Matthew Ridgway

See also
Thomas Ridgeway Gould